H.I.V.E. (short for Higher Institute of Villainous Education) is a series of young adult fiction novels by Mark Walden.

Plot overview
H.I.V.E., the Higher Institute of Villainous Education, is a top-secret school hidden inside an active volcano. The school is a part of G.L.O.V.E., the Global League of Villainous Enterprises, and was built for the purpose of training children to become criminal masterminds. Only children who have already displayed some villainous skill are accepted to the school. The school has four streams: the Alpha stream, Henchmen stream, Technical stream, and the Political/Financial stream. Each stream is associated with a color, which can be seen on their uniforms: Alphas have black, Henchman has blue, Technical is white, and Political/Financial is grey. Otto Malpense is a thirteen-year-old criminal genius selected with the other most intelligent, most athletic, technologically advanced children in the world to be part of H.I.V.E. In the first book, Otto enters the school; he discovers that all is not as it seems and sets out to reveal the mystery behind the school and its organization. Otto and his friends, Wing, Shelby, and Laura try to defy the headmaster, Dr. Maximilian Nero, and attempt to escape H.I.V.E. alive, a feat never previously accomplished.

H.I.V.E. books
Higher Institute of Villainous Education (2006)
The Overlord Protocol (2007)
Escape Velocity (2008)
Interception Point/Spook's Tale (2009) (World Book day Special, only 60 pages long and accompanied with other book)
Dreadnought (2009)
Rogue (2010)
Zero Hour (2010)
Aftershock (2011)
Deadlock (2013)
Bloodline (2021)

Reception
H.I.V.E. has received mostly favorable reviews. Jack Heath, author of Money Run, said that "if you can suspend your disbelief far enough, you will find it a rewarding read... The dialogue is witty, the plot twists deft, and the setting inventive, with plenty of knowing nods to the comic books and Bond films which pioneered the super villain tropes." The first book was given a score of 4/5 on ABC.net.au, where it was praised as having "adventure, sacrifice, mystery, surprises and evil doings."

Summaries

Higher Institute of Villainous Education
After realising that the government funding that keeps the orphanage from closing down is being cut, Otto Malpense creates a remotely controlled device that is able to hack into the teleprompter and cause it to hypnotize whoever looks into it. He creates the device with the intent to publicly embarrass the Prime Minister during one of his speeches. After successfully completing his objective, he is ambushed and stunned by Raven (an assassin that works for H.I.V.E) and then awakes to find himself in a helicopter, strapped to his seat, and sitting across from a complete stranger. He finds out the stranger is named Wing Fanchu and they quickly become close friends. When the helicopter lands, Otto is informed that he will be spending the next six years of his life being schooled at H.I.V.E., the Higher Institute of Villainous Education. Dr. Nero, H.I.V.E's headmaster, is interested to know that it took more than two shots from Sleepers (knock-out weapons designed to replace tranquilizer darts) to
capture Wing, enough to send a normal boy in a coma for a few weeks. He expresses his concerns to Raven and asks her to keep a close eye on Wing and Otto. Meanwhile, Otto's special skills have marked him out as an Alpha — a leader of tomorrow. He quickly works out that his little stunt with the Prime Minister now has landed Otto at H.I.V.E though he has no intention of staying in this new prison, and be friends with many others who have been taken to H.I.V.E., like Laura Brand, Shelby Trinity, Nigel Darkdoom, and Franz Argentblum. Otto teams up with Wing, Laura, and Shelby, and together they hatch a daring escape plan. They travel through the hidden parts of the school, but as they nearly reach their freedom, their headmaster, Dr. Nero, reveals that all along they have been going on an impossible mission. However, Nigel Darkdoom has managed to stir up his own trouble on this night, and an enormous, flesh-eating plant (named Violet) he has accidentally bred escapes from the hydroponics lab. Everyone, including the students, jump into action to save the school, and they succeed (despite Dr. Nero and many others being injured). Otto and Wing are suddenly given a small window of opportunity to leave the school forever, but at the last second, they decide to stay. In the last chapter, it is revealed to the readers that Number One, Dr. Nero's boss and leader of G.L.O.V.E., in essence, has plans for Otto Malpense. Soon they will meet, and it will not be pretty.

The Overlord Protocol
When Wing receives news of his father's death, he selects Otto to accompany him, under Raven's supervision, to the funeral. However, before they can attend the funeral, the trio is attacked by mysterious assassins. Wing appears to be shot by Cypher, a mysterious member of G.L.O.V.E. who wants to seize power and close H.I.V.E. Otto and Raven barely escape with their lives, and hide in one of Raven's numerous, personal safe houses while awaiting instructions from Dr. Nero. Raven is to attempt to discover what Cypher is up to, with Otto at her side. They discover the unbeatable adversaries they battled with at the original safe house to be robots, engineered for combat. Cypher makes an attack on the school, threatening to kill the students of H.I.V.E to get what he wants. In a sudden turn of events, Wing is found alive, having been shot by a tranquilizer disguised as a lethal bullet, and joins his friends in their attempt to save the school. Ultimately, they win the battle, leaving Cypher injured, but not fatally, and Nero insists that he be dead to everyone but himself and the doctor who treated the patient. Otto and his friends find out that Cypher is Wing's father, explaining his kidnapping Wing. In addition, during Dr. Nero's interrogation, Cypher reveals that his motive for attacking the school was a project named the Renaissance Initiative. This project seeks to recreate Overlord, a homicidal AI that wishes to kill everything on the planet. Cypher believed that with the Overlord Protocol (A device allowing him to hack everything on the planet), and H.I.V.E. as hostage, he could attack the Renaissance Initiative, revealed to be led by no other than Number One. Otto and his friends find themselves glad to be out of danger and home for good, as well as excited that H.I.V.E.mind has had his personality functions restored.

Escape Velocity
Nero is kidnapped by H.O.P.E, the Hostile Operative Prosecution Executive, a new anti-terrorist organisation; and the Contessa takes over H.I.V.E. as headmistress with an elite guard known as the Phalanx. Otto, Wing, Laura, Shelby and Raven are forced to escape the school after being extracted by Raven and join forces with Diabolus Darkdoom - Nigel's supposedly traitorous dead father - who takes charge from a massive submarine known as the Megalodon. However, it soon emerges that Overlord, inside Number One's body, is behind the entire plot. Otto is Number One's clone, designed as a perfect host body for Overlord. They assault H.O.P.E in order to reclaim Nero, but are captured and sent into space, to Number One's hideout. Otto only narrowly escapes being taken over by Number One/Overlord, and is forced to delete H.I.V.E.mind in the process. Meanwhile, H.I.V.E. is under attack by the executioners known as the Reapers, the fights ensue as the teachers are shut out of H.I.V.E's systems, finally when all hope is lost the Contessa sacrifices herself to save the school by setting off a massive puddle of jet fuel.

Dreadnought
The arrival of new student Lucy Dexter causes some confusion among the students, although they quickly befriend her. On their way to a training mission, they briefly visit the Dreadnought, a new mobile command center for G.L.O.V.E. However, the mission is cancelled when the Dreadnought becomes attacked by a rogue G.L.O.V.E. member. Nero, Raven and the students narrowly escape, but Diabolus Darkdoom is left behind and enemy agents that are sent after them. They soon discover that Lucy Dexter is actually Contessa's Granddaughter and can control people with her voice, which is useful for the adventures they go on. They attempt to rescue Diabolus and foil the plan to use American weaponry, controlled by Air Force One, to set off a super-volcano and destroy civilization. While they succeed in rescuing Darkdoom, Otto must stay behind on an out-of-control Air Force One to disarm the weapon, and he passes out after being in a plane crash, leaving him in the custody of the U.S. Government. Trent speaks to the president then injects the Animus Fluid into Otto.

Rogue
Otto has been infected by Animuss , an organic supercomputer which can be programmed by H.O.P.E. to make Otto do their evil bidding. With a superhuman dangerous assassin called Ghost, he attacks members of G.L.O.V.E. Raven is on her own mission to find Sebastian Trent, but first, goes to a facility where there might be people with information. She gets to Khan and threatens him, so he starts to unlock his computer. As he is typing in his password, he is killed by a remote-controlled microexplosive device in his skull. She takes the laptop and just then, Nero picks her up to take her to the G.L.O.V.E. council meeting. At that meeting with the remaining G.L.O.V.E. members, who are waiting for Darkdoom to slip up, Darkdoom is pressured to make a decision. Eventually, Darkdoom issues a capture or kill order for Otto. During a later private meeting with Nero, Raven sees a sniper (Ghost) and just barely saves Darkdoom from being assassinated. While Darkdoom is in the H.I.V.E. medical center being healed, Professor Pike and Laura Brand try to fix the school's sporadic technical problems. Raven tries to hack through the Khan's laptop with Professor Pike's help, and she finds a picture of a seed in one picture. After consulting the biotechnology teacher, she discovers that this seed is most commonly found in the Amazon, which is where she is headed. Wing, who desperately wants to find Otto, stows away with her on the Shroud, but the pair of them are captured by H.O.P.E. Meanwhile, amidst the chaos at H.I.V.E., Nero brings another expert on artificial intelligence—a newly freed Cypher, to help investigate. They believe it to be Overlord, but it is actually H.I.V.E.mind rebuilding himself. Organic supercomputers always automatically repair themselves as seed programs, and when they reach the self-awareness stage, they are able to controlWhat do they control? Raven's original purpose for going to the Amazon was also to seek the help of an old friend, who is shown to betray her. Carlos Chavez was essentially the ruler of Brazil and had pinpointed Raven's arrival. Chavez had enlisted a commander named Rafael, but Raven and Wing together defeat Rafael's men and Raven finishes Rafael by slicing his throat. After the mission failure, Chavez, knowingly defying Nero's wishes, even more, puts a priority one notice on the GLOVE.net for "Operation Raven," which was to kill Raven. Lin Feng had supported Chavez's assassination attempt to kill Raven in order to prevent Nero from gaining power because Lin Feng knew Chavez was too unruly to actually control the council well, and that Lin Feng himself would take over G.L.O.V.E. eventually.

Cypher takes advantage of his freedom to seek out Wing at H.O.P.E.'s base, accompanied by Laura, Shelby, and Lucy as hostages that he took when he escaped. The girls escape him and free Raven, and when Otto begins to resist Animus (when he was told to kill Wing), Wing escapes to join them. When Otto distracts Ghost, Raven slices Ghost's head off, but Cypher finds the group and attempts to kill Otto in order to protect the world from Overlord. Cypher is shot dead by Wing, and Otto is nearly taken over by Overlord, but Laura uses the neural pulse device to eject Overlord and Animus from his system, nearly killing Otto in the process. Sebastian Trent attacks them, but he is taken over by Animus and subsequently killed, and Raven shoots him. The students return to H.I.V.E., where Otto recovers and tells Nero about some new information: Animus sought to destroy any organic material, but somehow with the Overlord, not H.I.V.E.mind (as Otto had once hoped), seed growing in him, the two fused together to become extremely powerful; every time Otto tried to hold them back, he himself weakened.

Because Darkdoom believes that his old idea of just ruling with respect wasn't good enough and that his injuries need more time to recover, he suggested Nero take over G.L.O.V.E. and add the touch of fear that Number One had. During their virtual meeting, with only 9 members, including Nero, remaining, G.L.O.V.E. was in peril. Nero proposes himself as the leader, but Lin Feng strongly opposes. With no other ally, because Raven killed Chavez, Lin Feng angrily leaves the council. It is shown later that Lin Feng is actually part of The Disciples, as he is talking to Pietor Furan about what had happened. Furan orders Lin Feng to apologize to Nero and regain his seat in G.L.O.V.E. Furan then tells Dr. Creed, whom he saved from the rainforest, to conduct an autopsy on Trent, who has been dead for 2 weeks. It is believed that the Animus would be inert, but it surprisingly lurches out and consumes Dr. Creed. The book is closed with a cliffhanger as the Overlord-Animus combination manages to survive in the doctor.

Zero Hour
Overlord has developed the power to move from body to body, if the body has been exposed to Animus.
New machines have been developed but the first glimpse to the public brings terror as Overlord takes control of the facility (an Advanced Weapons facility in Colorado). Then Raven is exposed to Animus, which means she is now under the control of Overlord. When Raven and Furan and a team try and capture Otto and his friends, they escape by going on Darkdoom's ship, the Megalodon. H.I.V.Emind is transferred to Otto's mind as Raven shut off H.I.V.Emind from the rest of the school.

Onboard they are suddenly attacked by the USA which are trying to also capture Otto as Overlord is holding several hostages which are important for USA. Nero, Otto, Wing, Laura, Lucy, Shelby and Laura go into the GCHQ, specifically Echelon to transmit a signal which activates Zero Hour. Otto also secretly installs a destroy code for Echelon, they gained access to GCHQ through the prime minister. He was one of Nero's old students but he betrayed them at the last minute and told where Otto was to overlord, this is because he was a Disciple, a follower of Overlord. Raven takes Otto, Lucy and Laura onboard and take them to AWP where overlord is.   

It is then released on how Overlord will take over the world, He will use a self-replicating Nanites mixed with animus which, if released will cause everyone to be a slave of Overlord.The battle is nearing the end, and The Disciples, followers of Overlord, are winning. Nero and Darkdoom must call into action their final effort - Zero Hour, in a desperate battle to the death. Zero Hour involves all the most successful ex-Alphas, each out-fitted with brand-new machinery and gadgets. They have to fight, and Lucy ends up dying, in a sacrifice for Otto. She tells him, "There always has to be a choice." Overlord then released the nanites however Otto used 4 nuclear missiles to completely obliterate the facility and destroy the nanites. Afterwards, he permanently closes down Echelon for Lucy.

The heroes survive, and it is obvious that Overlord is no more, but the organization that supports him is still very much there (the Disciples). Nero disbands the ruling council of G.L.O.V.E, telling them that they are a part of a "By-gone era". This obviously make them incredibly angry and some join the Disciples.

Aftershock
The former members of the G.L.O.V.E. ruling council are outraged at Nero's decision to disband the whole of the ruling council and create an entirely new one, so they decide to join the Disciples in a plot to sabotage the H.I.V.E. training program called the Hunt. Nero does not know the former council has joined The Disciples. Meanwhile, Dr. Nero has underestimated the cunning and resources of those who oppose him. Chief Dekker, the new Chief of Security at H.I.V.E. is actually a member of the Disciples (Overlord's followers), who forces Laura to find out the location of the Hunt or she will get the Disciples to kill Laura's family. Laura manages to persuade Otto and the others to help her to steal the location of the Hunt, even though they do not know what Chief Dekker had forced their friend to do.

When the Alphas set out to the Hunt, the Disciples were waiting for them. They murder fifteen Alpha students and kidnap the rest of them (including Laura, Nigel and the two new students, Tom and Penny- Otto's old friends) and they are taken to the mysterious assassin training facility called the Glasshouse by Anastasia Furan – the new leader of the Disciples and a ghostly character from Raven's past. Luckily, Otto, Wing, Shelby, and Franz manage to escape and return to H.I.V.E., but Otto ends up being expelled for his part in the stealing of the location of the Hunt. Dr. Nero decides to make an agreement with Otto: if he, Raven and H.I.V.E.mind can track down the Disciples, then he will be allowed to return to H.I.V.E. The book ends with Raven and Otto traveling through Europe to assassinate the Disciples.

Deadlock
Otto and Raven are desperate to rescue their friends from the clutches of Anastasia Furan, head of the evil Disciples organization. First they must track down the location of the Glasshouse, the prison where Furan trains children to become ruthless assassins. But Otto is also being hunted. The past three months that Otto has spent away from H.I.V.E. have given the Artemis Section an opportunity to locate him. The Artemis Section is an elite division of the American intelligence services that specializes in capturing the toughest targets. They report only to the President, which is very bad news for Otto. During the period when the pupils are captured in the Glasshouse Tom dies after an escape attempt. However, they managed to send a signal of their whereabouts to H.I.V.E as this happened. Anastasia Furan spent years trying to create a clone which looks like Otto named Zero. Otto kills Zero with the help of H.I.V.E. Mind, who transferred to the supercomputer inside Zero's head and the New Glasshouse is destroyed. Nero takes Anastasia and locks her beneath H.I.V.E. The book ends with Otto and Laura kissing and a short chapter at the end. Before, Zero had hinted at there being more clones. The short chapter shows a dozen or so cloning vats. Inside of each is a growing clone of Otto. There is a countdown above each vat.

Bloodline
The book starts with a clone called A99A controlling a man called Dr Higgs, A99A is then found out to be an extremely power-full clone of Otto. A99A then renames herself Anna and threatens the research team and ensures that they continue making her clones. Meanwhile she controls a Disciple called Joseph Wright and makes him find where Anastasia Furan is being kept. They soon learn that she is being kept at H.I.V.E. Meanwhile at H.I.V.E an attack on H.I.V.Emind is worrying Professor Pike who accuses Otto. Soon it is clear that it is not Otto, they go to H.I.V.Eminds control room and find that Anna is attacking him. Soon H.I.V.Emind falls and Anna has complete control of the school. It seems that Anna has powers that even Otto doesn't have, she can control someone using her voice which is only exclusive to the Sinistre family plus having Otto's ability to interface everything relating to electronics. Nero and Otto and his friends escape barely with the help of Darkdoom and his new massive submarine which is named "Megalodon" just like his old one. Nero, Darkdoom and Otto together go and visit the only remaining survivor of the Sinistre family called the Queen. At the same time while they are being transported there, it is revealed that one of the security teams actually work for the Disciples notifying the Disciples which lead them to send a squad. Also the Artemis section notices Otto and also send in a SEALs team plus fighter jets. 

Nero is suspicious that the Queen has an involvement with this as Otto's information the voice is exactly like hers. However the Queen is confident that she did not have an involvement. Although she becomes enraged when she learns that the Furans have used her voice. At that precise moment,both the Disciples team and the USA Seals team converge and invade the house. The Queen is forced to lead them to a secret passageway which leads to the roof. Initially Otto and Nero escape by using a helicopter however they crash after being hit. Both get captured, Nero by the Disciples and Otto by the Artemis section. Darkdoom and the Queen escape through a Shroud, a stealth helicopter, from the Megalodon. Nero is held at H.I.V.E and is tortured by Anastasia Furan and Raven. Otto is taken and he is interrogated by the President, who believes that Otto is responsible for Anna's hacking of the global surveillance programs which results in a Russian ship just disappearing which was Anna's fault. The president believes Otto and shows him something. He shows Otto that they have a bit of Animus which Otto had thought had been destroyed in Zero Hour. Dardoom and Otto then rendezvous and hatch a plan to defeat Anna. However the plan goes horribly wrong and Darkdoom's men are killed and it is revealed to be a trap. Otto is captured while the rest have to fight. At H.I.V.E Wing, Mrs Leon and Penny are trying to initiate the evacuation plan which they successfully do and it launches the students of the volcano and it into the ocean and the surrounding area. During this it causes widespread disruption, the robots which survived Cypher's attack and were being used by Anna clatter to the floor as their circuits were short circuited.

Otto confronts Anna and pulls out the Animus and injects himself, he becomes insanely powerful and manages to trap Anna. With this when Anastasia Furan,was forcing Raven to torture and later to kill Nero. The Queen, who has been captured, is killed by Anastasia Furan. It is then revealed that Raven is Nero's daughter. However when Anna is captured, Raven is released of her control and kills Anastasia Furan, Otto kills Anna's clones by purging their tanks, Nero and Otto's friends and the teachers board a shroud and are waiting for Otto. However it suddenly takes off and Otto is revealed to be the cause he reveals that he will probably die as the Animus is killing him. He says he is sorry for betraying them and cuts off. He then thanks H.I.V.Emind and H.I.V.Emind thanks him, however H.I.V.Emind kills Otto and transfers him to one of the clones of Anna and in 1 year he will be reborn.The whole volcano explodes as H.I.V.Emind sets off a small nuclear bomb at the base of the volcano, Otto's friends grieve for him. It is not told if H.I.V.Emind survives.

Characters

H.I.V.E. students

Otto Malpense – The main character of the series, a white-haired English boy who was raised in an orphanage. At H.I.V.E., he discovered the ability to interface telepathically with computer networks, which is due to a supercomputer implanted into his brain by Overlord in order to make Otto the perfect replacement body. Although Otto's ability to communicate with computers is very useful when searching for information, it leaves him vulnerable to possession by Overlord and other artificial intelligences like Animus, although the supercomputer allowed him a refuge from which to regain control of his body. In Aftershock, Otto was expelled from H.I.V.E. because he had unknowingly been part of a plan which led to the murder of fifteen Alpha students and the kidnapping of the rest of them (apart from himself, Wing, Shelby and Franz).
Wing Fanchu – A tall Asian boy who is Otto's best friend. His parents, Wu Zhang and Xiu Mei Chen, were G.L.O.V.E. operatives in hiding after the failure of the Overlord project. After his mother's death, he was enrolled at H.I.V.E. by his fathers request. He is very loyal to his friends and protects them in times of danger, but he is often teased for lacking a sense of humour. He refuses to kill his enemies because he promised his mother he would never take a life. Wing had a difficult relationship with his father, who became the villain Cypher in Overlord Protocol, and who he believed to be dead on more than one occasion. In the Overlord Protocol, Cypher fell from a high-up walkway and Wing thought he'd killed him, but, his father reappeared in Rogue, but Wing greeted him only with anger and eventually shot him after he tried to kill Otto, leaving him definitely dead this time.
Laura Brand – A Scottish girl who is an expert computer hacker. She was sent to H.I.V.E. after hacking into a military airbase to spy on a school friend's conversations. She is close friends with her roommate Shelby and enjoys discussing computers with Otto, who it is hinted she has a romantic attraction to. In Aftershock, this attraction was proven to be true. In Aftershock, she was forced by Chief Dekker (who was actually a member of the Disciples) to find out the location of the Hunt, or she would get the Disciples to kill Laura's family. Laura did what she was told and got the location of the Hunt for Dekker, which led to the murder of fifteen Alpha students and the kidnapping of the rest of them (apart from Otto, Wing, Shelby and Franz). Laura joined the kidnapped Alpha students in the Glasshouse
Shelby Trinity – A wealthy American girl who joined H.I.V.E. after gaining fame as the jewel thief "The Wraith". She is good at martial arts, but her area of expertise is stealth and lock-picking. She is the most talkative and adventurous of the group, and it is sometimes hinted that she has romantic feelings for Wing. In Zero Hour, she started a romantic relationship with Wing. She is very sarcastic and tries to make light of any situation the group find themselves in. Her greatest fear is being locked up - probably from being 'The Wraith'.
Nigel Darkdoom – Son of the infamous Diabolus Darkdoom. He is reluctant to follow in his father's footsteps, particularly as he believes his father is dead until Escape Velocity. He excels at Hydroponics, and in the first book inadvertently creates a monster plant named "Violet" which attacks the school. Although he is sometimes considered weak, he insists on helping the others in times of danger. He is best friends with Franz and the pair of them are often bullied by Block and Tackle.
Franz Argentblum – Son of a German chocolate magnate and villain. English is not his first language and his grammar is often unusual. He is described as very overweight, and constantly thinking about food. He is close friends with Nigel. Often in the series, apart from the first book, he reminds his friends about his heroics in saving the school in The Overlord Protocol, where he apprehends Colonel Francisco before a bomb attached to the energy generator, transferring the power from the active volcano, blows up.
Tom Ransom – A student at H.I.V.E. who arrived at the beginning of Aftershock. He is an orphan who went to the same orphanage as Otto and is mentioned in book 1 to steal things for him. After Otto left the orphanage, he and his friend Penny started their own wealth redistribution program (nicknamed “the Hoods” after Robin Hood) until they came to H.I.V.E. in Aftershock and they joined the Alpha stream. He and Penny are captured by the Disciples and taken to the Glasshouse. To cause a distraction so Laura could send a distress signal, Tom deliberately got into a fight with Nigel, the fight was broken up by Anastasia Furan who shot Tom in the chest - killing him.
Penny Richards – A student at H.I.V.E. who arrived at the beginning of Aftershock. She is an orphan who went to the same orphanage as Otto and is mentioned in book 1 to steal things for him. After Otto left the orphanage, she and her friend Tom started their own wealth redistribution program (nicknamed “the Hoods” after Robin Hood) until they came to H.I.V.E. in Aftershock and they joined the Alpha stream. She and Tom are captured by the Disciples and taken to the Glasshouse. Tom's death turns her against Otto and his friends.
Viscontessa Lucia Sinestre a.k.a. Lucy Dexter – A new student at H.I.V.E. who arrived at the beginning of Dreadnought and was placed in the same Alpha stream class as the others. She quickly befriended the group, particularly Laura and Shelby, but she was initially sceptical of their tales of past adventures. She was the granddaughter of the Contessa and shared her ability to control others with her voice, although she could only control a few people at once. In Zero Hour she started a romantic relationship with Otto, but later in the book, she was shot by Furan who was being controlled by Overlord and she was presumably eaten by the Animus nanites along with Furan and Overlord. Otto refused to leave her to die but she used her voice powers to force him to leave and save himself.
Block and Tackle - Two students from the Henchman stream who repeatedly bully the Alphas, particularly Otto and Wing.This is described as a result of Otto and Wing taking them down in the first book, which makes them look foolish as they are supposedly strong and unbeatable. 
Cole Harrington – A fifth-year Politics and Finance stream student who attempted to forcefully take H.I.V.E. mind's source code from Otto (only minutes after Otto had stolen it himself) and sell it on the black market. Otto managed to frame Harrington so it looked like he had stolen the code, and he was locked in the brig at H.I.V.E. He was later killed by Chief Dekker (who was actually working for the Disciples) in her attempt to make it look like he had committed suicide.

H.I.V.E. staff
Dr. Maximilian Nero - The Headmaster of H.I.V.E. who became the leader of G.L.O.V.E. at the end of Rogue. He is a very careful villain who prefers to plan before acting, and in spite of his reputation for heartlessness, he cares a lot about H.I.V.E. and its students. He also treats Raven as a friend and is very protective of her. He has run H.I.V.E. since the 1960s, although he only appears in his 30s. In the past, he was involved in the Overlord project and he was nearly killed.
Contessa Maria Sinistre - Originally one of Nero's most trusted teachers, she was bribed by Cypher to help him in the Overlord Protocol. She had the ability to make anybody do what she ordered them to, although the strong willed could resist her. In Escape Velocity, she became headmistress of H.I.V.E. after Nero's kidnap and was involved in a plan to attack the school, but she changed sides and sacrificed her life to save the students, and she was remembered as a hero. She had a daughter who died, and a granddaughter, Lucy Dexter.
Natalya/Raven, used as a code name, is the most feared assassin in H.I.V.E. and perhaps the rest of the world. She was trained by the Furans during her childhood at their terrifying castle – the Glasshouse. After seeing her best friend, Dimitri, shot dead by Anastasia Furan and after being forced by the Furans to kill her other friend Tolya, Raven swore that she would kill them both for what they had done to her and her friends. She has a long, curved scar that runs down one cheek. She has a pale but beautiful face, perfectly symmetrical (except the scar) and has cold blue eyes. Her main weapons are a pair of dual katanas, which she uses with great expertise and she had been in possession of since she was forced to kill her friend Tolya with them during her childhood at the Glasshouse. She replaced her original katanas with newer ones Professor Pike created in the Overlord Protocol.
Colonel Francisco – The head of Tactical Education at H.I.V.E. who is thought of by the students as one of the toughest teachers at H.I.V.E. He has an artificial metal hand.
Professor William Pike – The head of the Technology department at H.I.V.E. and was one of the original creators of H.I.V.E.mind. He appears to be disorganized and distracted, but he has a brilliant, shrewd and cunning mind. He looks at least a hundred years old and his hairs seems to explode from his head like a firework.
Ms. Tabitha Leon – The head of Stealth and Evasion at H.I.V.E. whose consciousness got transferred into the body of her pet cat after a failed experiment by Professor Pike. Although she dislikes being a cat, she finds some new features like enhanced hearing and claws very useful.
Ms. Gonzales – The head of the Biotechnology department at H.I.V.E. who is an expert on all kinds of plants. Genetic manipulation of plant life to produce a host of dangerous and deadly results is her specialty.
H.I.V.E.mind - H.I.V.E.mind is the school's AI who runs and monitors the entire school and was created by Professor Pike. In the battle with Overlord in Escape Velocity, H.I.V.E.mind sacrificed his life to destroy Overlord by telling Otto to delete both Overlord and himself from Otto's mind, but H.I.V.E.mind later rebuilds himself in Rogue (unfortunately Overlord also rebuilt himself). In Zero Hour, H.I.V.E.mind was downloaded into the device in Otto's head and he later helped to finally destroy Overlord for good. Although he had to get out of Otto's head at the end of Zero Hour, he was allowed back in again at the end of Aftershock to help Otto to track down the Disciples.
Chief Lewis – The former head of H.I.V.E.’s security teams who played a secondary role in most books. In the fourth book Dreadnought he wasn’t mentioned, instead Head of Security was Chief Monroe. He was a trustworthy member of staff and was either very good at his job or just very lucky to have survived as long as he did. But, in Zero Hour, he was killed by Raven while she was infected with Animus and under the control of Overlord and the Disciples.
Chief Dekker – The new Head of Security at H.I.V.E. who came to the school in Aftershock, after Chief Lewis’ death in Zero Hour. She was tall and painfully thin, had short grey hair and eyes that always seemed to be watching you. Dekker was actually a member of the Disciples who forced Laura to find out the location of the Hunt in Aftershock, or she would get the Disciples to kill Laura's family, which led to the murder of fifteen Alpha students and the kidnapping of the rest of them (apart from Otto, Wing, Shelby and Franz). But Nero and Raven found out that Dekker was a Disciple, and she was tortured until she gave Raven the location where Laura's parents had been kept. Unfortunately, she did not know where Laura and the other kidnapped Alphas had been taken.
Mrs. McTavish – H.I.V.E.’s librarian who was mentioned in Escape Velocity when she pulled Otto out of his virtual computer world and back into the real world.
Ms. Tennenbaum – The German head of the Finance and Corruption department at H.I.V.E. who is usually one of the most emotionless teachers in the school.
Mr. Rictor – The teacher of Logistics and Operations at H.I.V.E. who (according to Otto) is not the most enthralling speaker, but the information he shares is fascinating.
Dr. Scott – H.I.V.E.’s chief medical officer who was the only person in the world until Rogue apart from Nero who knew that Cypher had survived his attempt to destroy H.I.V.E. in Overlord Protocol. Dr Scott also helped to cure Diabolus Darkdoom when he was shot in Rogue, and he helped to cure Nero when he was stabbed in Zero Hour.

G.L.O.V.E. members
Number One – The former commander of the G.L.O.V.E. who was actually being controlled by Overlord since when he attempted to destroy the AI. He was killed in Escape Velocity, however Overlord lived on. Otto is Number One's clone and he looks exactly like the young Number One.
The Reapers – Number One's personal executioners, an utterly ruthless death squad that left no one alive in its wake. They all carry heavy machine guns and wear black body armour that have white skulls on the faceplates.
The Phalanx – The elite, well-trained team of operatives who were tasked with the protection of Number One himself. All the members of the Phalanx wore tiny skull-shaped pins somewhere on their bodies. A small group of Phalanx came to H.I.V.E. in Escape Velocity to protect the Contessa when she became headmistress.
Diabolus Darkdoom - Diabolus Darkdoom is an infamous villain who was considered a legend and was the leader of G.L.O.V.E. during Dreadnought and Rogue. Number One believed he knew too much about the Renaissance Initiative and had him framed as a traitor. Diabolus then faked his death before he could be killed and lived on his submarine, Megalodon, for several years. In Escape Velocity, he helped Otto to rescue Dr. Nero in the Swiss Alps, and he helped to destroy Overlord for good in Zero Hour. His son, Nigel Darkdoom, is a student of H.I.V.E.
Cypher (Mao Fanchu/Wu Zhang) - Originally the co-creator of Overlord, Cypher is a lunatic who planned a revolt against Number One in Overlord Protocol which failed. He was hidden in the vaults of H.I.V.E. until Rogue, when he tricked Nero and Professor Pike into letting him out so he could help them, which led to his escape. He was shot by his son Wing later in Rogue, after trying to kill Otto in order to destroy Overlord.
Xiu Mei Chen – Wing's mother and the creator of Overlord. It was thought that she was killed by Overlord, but she actually survived and started a new life in Japan as Wing's mother, but she found out about the Overlord Protocol – some codes that if they came into Overlord's possession, he would be able to rebuild himself and would be able to control all of the computer systems in the world. Xiu Mei Chen knew that he could not be allowed to do this, so she hid the codes in two twin ying-yang amulets. She gave one amulet to Wing, and sent the other to Nero. Number One found out that she knew about the Overlord Protocol, so he ordered for her to be killed.
Joseph Wright – The former head of G.L.O.V.E.’s British operations. After Nero disbanded the whole to the G.L.O.V.E. ruling council at the end of Zero Hour and created an entire new one, he attempted to kill Nero at the beginning of Aftershock, but failed. Later in the book, Wright was contracted by the Disciples in Aftershock and joined them in a plan to destroy G.L.O.V.E.
Wade Jackson – The former head of G.L.O.V.E.’s North American operations who was dismissed from the ruling council at the end of Zero Hour when Nero disbanded the whole of the council and created an entire new one, so he joined the Disciples at the beginning of Aftershock.
Luca Venturi – The former head of G.L.O.V.E.’s Southern European operations who was dismissed from the ruling council at the end of Zero Hour when Nero disbanded the whole of the council and created an entire new one, so he joined the Disciples at the beginning of Aftershock.
Felicia Diaz – The former head of G.L.O.V.E.’s South American operation who joined G.L.O.V.E. in Zero Hour as the successor to Carlos Chavez. She was dismissed from the ruling council at the end of Zero Hour when Nero disbanded the whole of the council and created an entire new one, so she joined the Disciples at the beginning of Aftershock.
Baron Von Sturm – A former G.L.O.V.E. member who was dismissed from the ruling council at the end of Zero Hour when Nero disbanded the whole of the council and created an entire new one, so he joined the Disciples at the beginning of Aftershock.
Lin Feng – The former head of G.L.O.V.E.’s Chinese operations who was actually working for the Disciples. At the end of Rogue, he attempted to leave G.L.O.V.E. because he was angry about Nero's decision to become the head of G.L.O.V.E., but the Disciples forced him to beg Nero for his seat back because they needed a man inside G.L.O.V.E. In Zero Hour, Feng was betrayed by the Disciples and was killed by Raven while she was infected with Animus and under their control.
Carlos Chavez – The former chief of G.L.O.V.E.’s South American operations whose villainous career had started in the slums of Rio. In Rogue, he attempted to kill Raven because he was angry at Diabolus Darkdoom for becoming head of G.L.O.V.E. instead of himself. But Raven found out that Chavez had tried to kill her, so she killed him at the end of Rogue.
The Lobos – Carlos Chavez's team of soldiers and assassins who trained in an underground area underneath Chavez's office building in Rio. Most of these men were killed in Rogue when they launched an attack on Raven on Mount Corcovado in Rio.
Rafael – Carlos Chavez's most trusted lieutenant and a member of the Lobos. He was sent on a mission by Chavez to eliminate Raven in Rogue, which led to him being killed when Raven slit his throat and the failure of the mission.
Madam Mortis – A former member of G.L.O.V.E. who was killed by Otto at the beginning of Rogue when he was infected by Animus and under H.O.P.E. ’s control. In Overlord Protocol, she came up with the idea of using computer controlled sharks to kill G.L.O.V.E.’s enemies, but this idea was rejected by Number One.
Jonas Steiner – A former G.L.O.V.E. member who was killed at the beginning of Rogue when Otto (who has been injected by Animus and was being controlled by H.O.P.E) sabotaged his private jet's navigation system and autopilot, causing it to crash into the Bavarian Alps.
Gregori Leonov – A Russian man who was one of the longest surviving members of G.L.O.V.E. and was a good friend of Nero. The Reapers (Number One's executioners) killed his whole family in Escape Velocity when he discovered the Renaissance Initiative (Number One's plans to rebuild Overlord) and when Leonov tried to warn Nero about these plans, he was killed by a H.O.P.E. assassin.
Yuri Leonov – The son of Gregori Leonov who once attended H.I.V.E. but worked for his father in Overlord Protocol. He was killed by the Reapers (Number One's executioners) in Escape Velocity when Number One sent them to kill his father and all of his family.
Agent One – A Japanese bodyguard who helped Raven to protect Wing and Otto in Tokyo in Overlord Protocol. He was killed when Cypher's robots attacked the safe house they were hiding him and one of the robots broke his neck after he threw a smoke grenade.
Agent Zero – An American bodyguard who helped Raven to protect Wing and Otto in Tokyo in Overlord Protocol. He was killed when he was shot by Cypher.
Jason Drake– An American former G.L.O.V.E. member and owner of multi-nation corporation Drake Industries, which developed much of the advanced technology that G.L.O.V.E. used on a daily basis. He was a handsome man with short dark hair and an immaculately trimmed goatee beard. He went rogue in Dreadnought and began to work for the Disciples, believing that Number One's death was a coup by Maximilian Nero and Diabolus Darkdoom in order to seize control of G.L.O.V.E. He was further angered when his greatest project (The Dreadnought) was taken by Darkdoom as his flagship, when previously he hoped to present it to Number One in order to gain favor with him. Drake was killed by Pietor Furan when he revealed that the Disciples no longer needed him. He was responsible for the design of the Shroud dropships, the larger Leviathan, and the Dreadnought.

The Disciples
Pietor Furan - An assassin who used to work for the Spetsnaz, Russia's elite special forces unit, who was then recruited by the Disciples. He and his sister, Anastasia Furan, created the Glasshouse – a castle in the snowy wilderness of Russia where they cruelly trained children who they hoped would become their future assassins. This is the place where Furan and his sister trained Raven, although Raven swore that she would kill them after Anastasia shot her best friend, Dimitri, and forced her to kill her other friend, Tolya. Pietor Furan was tall, heavily muscled, and Ukrainian, with closely shaved grey hair and a star shaped pattern of scars surrounding his right eye, which was blinded by Raven when she was 11 years old. He first appeared in Dreadnought and seemed to be working for Jason Drake, but, under the Disciples orders he infected the Dreadnought with Animus and killed Jason before making his escape. While working for the Disciples in Zero Hour, Pietor Furan was killed when Raven stabbed him with one of her katanas. Only seconds after his death, Overlord took over his body and used his as a host, but he was eaten alive by Animus nanites.
Anastasia Furan/Minerva - The leader of the Disciples in Aftershock who helped to train Raven with her brother, Pietor Furan. She and her brother created the Glasshouse – a castle in the snowy wilderness of Russia where they cruelly trained children who they hoped would become their assassins. This is the place where she and her brother trained Raven, although Raven swore that she would kill them after Anastasia shot her best friend, Dimitri, and forced her to kill her other friend, Tolya. In the past, Anastasia Furan sent Raven to kill Nero, but instead she was captured and brought to the temporary H.I.V.E. when the new facility was still under construction. Nero managed to convince Raven that she had a choice and didn't have to listen to Anastasia. A few months later, Nero, Diabolus Darkdoom and Raven carried out an attack on the Glasshouse and when Anastasia was about to escape in a helicopter, Raven shot the helicopter down and thought Anastasia to be dead. However, Pietor found Anastasia still alive and she managed to survive, although it left her face hideously disfigured and covered in scar tissue, relics of horrific burns due to the fire she endured in the wreckage of the crashed helicopter. Anastasia got her revenge on Raven in Aftershock by finding out the location of the Hunt, murdering fifteen Alpha students and kidnapping the rest of them (apart from Otto, Wing, Shelby and Franz).
Tobias Scheckter – An eastern European geologist who was running from the Disciples at the beginning of Dreadnought. While working for them, he had found out what they were planning and tried to warn the Government, but he was arrested by a local policeman called Sam Fletcher. The policeman's car was bombed by the Disciples and both Tobias and the policeman were killed.
Duncan Cavendish/Disciple 9 – The British prime minister during Book 6 - Zero Hour. Dr Nero requests access to GCHQ from him for Otto, Wing, Shelby, and Laura to allow H.I.V.E.mind to transmit the Zero Hour Code. It turns out that he was working for the Disciples all along and after granting them access gave Pietor Furan the students' location.

H.O.P.E. Characters
Sebastian Trent - The former leader of H.O.P.E. who told the world that he was trying to stop terrorism, but he actually helped Overlord and the Disciples. He was thin, pale and completely bald, apart from a neatly clipped band of white hair above each ear. He was killed in Rogue by Animus that had a tiny part of Overlord inside, which meant that even though Overlord should have been permanently destroyed, he lived on because he used Trent's body as a host.
Dr. Creed – The scientist at H.O.P.E. who injected Animus into Otto's body so that H.O.P.E. could control him. He was killed at the end of Rogue when he was infected by some Animus that had a tiny part of Overlord inside it, which meant that Creed was the host for Overlord's rebirth.
Verity/Ghost – Originally one of the two twin assassins (the other being Constance) who worked for H.O.P.E. in Escape Velocity. Being identical twins, she and her sister had long blonde hair tied back in ponytails and upper-class British accents. When her sister was killed by Raven in Escape Velocity by falling on one of Raven's katanas, Verity was bound and gagged and taken captive by Raven, but freed by another unknown H.O.P.E member. She was distorted and tried to avenge her sister by killing Raven, but failed. Although she was killed when she fell from a cable car in Escape Velocity, she was brought back as a cyborg and was code named Ghost. The scientists at H.O.P.E. enhanced her body by fusing her flesh with cybernetic implants and they made her armor that could not be penetrated by Raven's katanas. Even with these enhancements, she was eventually killed when Raven cut off her head in Rogue.
Constance – One of the two twin assassins (the other being Verity) who worked for H.O.P.E. in Escape Velocity. Being identical twins, she and her sister had long blonde hair tied back in ponytails and upper-class British accents. She died after being pushed by Raven onto one of her katanas that Verity was holding.

Other Characters
 Overlord – The murderous AI (artificial intelligence) who wanted to take over the world. He was created by Xiu Mei Chen in the mountains of China twenty years ago and he was nearly destroyed by Number One, but at the last minute Overlord used him as a host and lived on. Although it was thought that Otto destroyed Overlord when he tried to take over Otto's mind in Escape Velocity, a tiny part of Overlord survived and he rebuilt himself inside Otto's head in Rogue. Laura shot Otto with a neural pulse devise that Cypher and Professor Pike had built and Overlord was forced out of Otto's head, but because Overlord had fused with the Animus inside Otto, the AI developed the ability to move from body to body, erasing their personality and eventually killing them. Overlord was finally destroyed for good when Otto left him to be eaten by Animus nanites in Zero Hour.
 The Architect/Nathaniel – The man who designed buildings for various organizations (and accidentally the next Glasshouse), revealed to be Nero's father in Deadlock.
 Nazim Khan – The Arabic man who designed H.O.P.E.’s camouflaged facility in the Amazon Rainforest in Rogue. Although the Disciples and H.O.P.E. said that they would protect him, they betrayed him in Rogue and he was attacked by Raven. Khan tried to give Raven the details of Trent’s facility, but he was killed by a micro-explosive device implanted in his skull that was triggered remotely by H.O.P.E.
Dimitri – The young Raven’s best friend at the Glasshouse (the Furans’ castle where they cruelly trained children who they hoped would become their assassins). During a failed escape attempt from the Glasshouse, Dimitri was killed when Anastasia Furan shot him after he had tried to be a hero and get survival suits for Raven and Tolya as well as himself. Raven described him as the only person the Furans had not broken in spirit and so he helped the others to not break as well.
Tolya – One of the young Raven's friends at the Glasshouse (the Furans’ castle where they cruelly trained children who they hoped would become their assassins). During a failed escape attempt from the Glasshouse, he and Raven watched their best friend Dimitri be shot and killed by Anastasia Furan. The Furans then locked Tolya and Raven up for weeks, but Tolya went insane and the Furans set him against Raven which he did without hesitation, forcing Raven to kill him. As he died, there was realization in his eyes which left Raven guilty.
Mary, Andrew, and Douglas Brand – Laura's parents and baby brother who were kidnapped by the Disciples in Aftershock and were used to threaten Laura into finding out the location of the Hunt. Although Laura gave the location of the Hunt to the Disciples, the Brands were going to be killed by them, but they were saved just in time by Raven.
Mrs. McReedy – The head of Otto's former orphanage (St Sebastian's) before he came to H.I.V.E., but in reality, Otto was actually running the orphanage for her. Otto seemed to care about her or he may have just wanted to keep her there because he knew he could use her to control the Orphanage. She was the test subject for his hypnosis device, and he had her on all four's acting like a dog for a couple of minutes .
Lao – An old Japanese man who maintained the gardens of Wing's childhood house. He trained Wing to fight and was the closest thing to a father that Wing ever had. He tried to fight off the men from H.I.V.E. who came to take Wing away and failed, but survived.
Captain Sanders – The captain of the Megalodon (Diabolus Darkdoom's huge submarine) in Escape Velocity and Zero Hour.
Dr. Charles Morley – The leader of the group of scientists who cloned Number One to create the baby Otto. When they had completed the job, Morley and his team were all killed by explosive devices that Number One had hidden throughout the facility where Otto was created so that they could not tell anyone what they had been doing there.
Elena Furan – She was Anastasia and Pietor Furan's sister. In Aftershock, Anastasia told Raven to kill Nero because he killed someone she loved previously. Nero also wanted Anastasia dead because she killed someone he loved. Both characters are referring to Elena Furan, whom both thought the opposite side had killed.

Organizations and facilities
H.I.V.E. – The Higher Institute of Villainous Education which is a school for children skilled at evil.
G.L.O.V.E. – The Global League of Villainous Enterprises which was originally run by Number One, but Diabolus Darkdoom became its leader at the end of Escape Velocity and in Dreadnought, and Nero became its leader at the end of Rogue. G.L.O.V.E.’s symbol is a fist hammering down on to a splintering globe. At the end of Zero Hour, Nero disbanded the whole of the G.L.O.V.E. ruling council and created an entirely new one, which led to the former council members joining the Disciples.
The Disciples – Overlord's most trusted followers and supporters who will do anything to destroy G.L.O.V.E. and continue Overlord's work.
H.O.P.E. – The Hostile Operative Prosecution Executive which claimed that it was an anti-terrorist organization, but it was actually helping the Disciples. Its symbol was an angel flying upwards with a sword held aloft in its outstretched hands.
The Glasshouse – Pietor and Anastasia Furan's castle in which they cruelly train children who they hope will turn into their assassins. It was located somewhere in the snowy wilderness of Russia. This is the place in which Raven was trained by the Furans during her childhood, and it is also the place in which all of the kidnapped Alpha stream students at H.I.V.E. were taken at the end of Aftershock.
The Advanced Weapons Project Facility (AWP) – The secret base in Colorado where the Goliaths were created in Zero Hour. During the demonstration of the Goliaths, Overlord and the Disciples arrived and captured all of the important government workers who were there for the demonstration. AWP became Overlord's base for the days that followed, and it was the place where the final battle between Overlord's forces and the Zero Hour team of former H.I.V.E. pupils took place. AWP was blown up by a nuclear missile at the end of Zero Hour in order to destroy the Animus nanites that Overlord had released.
The Vault – The most secure place in the Advanced Weapons Project Facility (AWP) and was where Overlord and Pietor Furan retreated to in Zero Hour with Laura and Lucy as hostages when they realised that Nero's Zero Hour team of former H.I.V.E. pupils were inside the AWP facility. Raven and Otto managed to get inside the Vault, which led to the deaths of Overlord, Furan and Lucy, but Raven, Otto and Laura made it out alive.
The Government Communication Headquarters (GCHQ) - The hub of Britain's intelligence communications network which is located in Cheltenham. In Zero Hour, Nero talked to the Prime Minister (a former H.I.V.E. pupil) and managed to get Otto and the other Alphas unrestricted access to GCHQ, so that they could use the equipment there to activate Nero's plan “Zero Hour” in order to stop Overlord. Although the team of Alphas did manage to activate Zero Hour, the Prime Minister betrayed them, which led to the capture of Otto, Laura and Lucy by the Disciples.
Echelon – The area inside the Government Communication Headquarters (GCHQ) in which every phone call, every internet search and every radio transmission was searched through by intelligent algorithms, looking for any hints to terrorist activity. In Zero Hour, Otto and the other Alphas had to go to Echelon in order to use the equipment there to activate Nero's plan “Zero Hour”. At the end of the book Zero Hour, Otto activated a code that permanently shut down Echelon as a symbol for Lucy saying 'everybody has a choice'.
Deepcore – MI6's most secure data storage archive, which is one hundred metres below the MI6 headquarters and is surrounded by security systems that are supposedly impossible to breach. Raven, Otto and the other Alphas had to break into Deepcore in Escape Velocity to find out where H.O.P.E. was keeping Nero prisoner.

Machines and devices
Animus – Self-replicating organic supercomputers which is used to control people and has the appearance of black slime. It was created by Overlord and it can take control of any system that it is inserted into. In and before Rogue, anyone apart from Otto who was injected with Animus would be killed by it because it's complexity made it lethal to most humans, but in Zero Hour, a new of Animus was developed by Overlord that was much simpler and therefore not lethal, but also unable to contain Overlord. Later in Zero Hour, Otto, Professor Pike and H.I.V.E.mind managed to create an antidote for Animus when Otto injected himself with a small sample and forced a connection with it, allowing H.I.V.E.mind to interface with and modify its code. The antidote of Animus was able to interface with Animus to reprogram it to act on the most basic principles of a computer virus - reprogramming code to copy itself by reprogramming more code.
Blackboxes – PDA devices used at H.I.V.E. that every student must have with them at all times. They are tracking devices, but they can also be useful in many other ways.
Grapplers – Devices that can be used to scale vertical surfaces or to descend safely from elevated positions. They look like armoured gauntlets with a small handle at one end and a bulky assembly attached to one side with a silver arrowhead protruding from it.
Raven's Twin Katanas – Raven's swords that she carries with her everywhere. She has had them since the age of thirteen, when she was forced by Pietor and Anastasia Furan to use them to kill her friend, Tolya. In Overlord Protocol, Professor Pike replaced the swords with new, updated ones that are electromagnetically shielded with a purple force field which means that they can cut through even the toughest metals.
Goliaths – Huge robots that were created by an American military organisation and have the ability to destroy tanks from the ground and in the air. At thirty metres tall, these armoured metal robots have multi-barreled Gatling cannons mounted on each arm and rocket pods on each shoulder. In the centre of each of the machines’ chests is a black glass cockpit shrouded in heavy armour where the pilot would sit and control it.
The Shrouds – H.I.V.E.’s aircraft that have cloaking fields that make them completely invisible to infrared and electromagnetic sensors and nearly invisible to optical sensors and have giant VTOL engines.
Dreadnought – Diabolus Darkdoom’s permanently airborne defence craft which looked almost like an advanced type of aerodynamic battleship but with four huge jet turbines that held the massive vessel aloft. It was made by Jason Drake and was designed to stay airborne indefinitely and provide G.L.O.V.E. with a permanent command post that was both safe and discreet. The craft was equipped with thermoptic camouflage systems just like the Shrouds, but it could also harness local weather systems used a feature called the Zeus Sphere, which could entirely conceal its presence from the eyes of the world. The craft was powered by the world’s first functioning fusion reactor, which meant that it harnessed the power of the sun and as such there was never any need to refuel. The craft was destroyed at the end of the book “Dreadnought” in which it was featured in.
Megalodon – Diabolus Darkdoom's huge stealth submarine which is the largest sub ever constructed and was used to save Otto and his friends in Escape Velocity and in Zero Hour. It is a completely self-sufficient vessel that can operate without resupply for years at a time and has the sonar signature of a torpedo, indicating that its anti-sonar technology and construction may have been based on the B2 stealth bombers anti-radar design.
Hammerhead – Diabolus Darkdoom's mini-submarine that Nero, Otto and the other Alphas used to escape the Megalodon in when they were being attacked by American Navy submarines in Zero Hour. It is essentially the Megalodon constructed on a smaller scale.
The Leviathan – A fully operational airborne command centre with a full cloak capability and the latest generation of long-range scramjet engines which used to belong to Jason Drake, but was used by Nero and Darkdoom in Zero Hour to travel to where Overlord and his forces were in order stop Overlord.
Overwatch – Jason Drake's satellite which had the ability to track down a single man anywhere in the world in a matter of seconds. It was used to scan New York in Dreadnought in order to find Nero, Raven, Otto and the other Alphas. It was launched with another satellite that Drake Industries did not work on – a deep black military project called Thor's Hammer that was designed to work in unison with Overwatch.
Thor's Hammer – A satellite that could fire a nuclear missile from orbit which could pierce so far underground before detonating that it could destroy an entire underground terrorist base in the blink of an eye. Jason Drake found out how to control it in Dreadnought, and planned to make a missile hit Yellowstone National Park which would trigger the supervolcano that lies beneath it, but luckily, Otto sabotaged this plan. In Zero Hour, Otto used Thor's Hammer to destroy a swarm of Animus nanites that Overlord released into the world.
The Zeus Sphere – A feature on the Dreadnought which could directly manipulate the climate immediately surrounding the craft to cloak it in storm clouds that were fully under control and could entirely conceal the aircraft's presence from the eyes of the world.
The Football – The slang name for the device that controlled access to launch codes for America's entire nuclear arsenal which is looked after by the President of the United States. In Dreadnought, Jason Drake kidnapped the President and the device was under Drake's control but, luckily, Otto sabotaged Drake's plans.
Hunter Drones – Jason Drake's small, mechanical assassination devices which were set on Nero, Otto and Wing in Dreadnought when they broke into Drake Industries’ headquarters in New York. The deadly machines were fitted with heavy machine guns and had twin turbine pods on each side which meant that they had the ability to fly.
Integrated Systems Infiltration Suit (ISIS) – A suit that combines thermoptic camouflage with advance Kevlar polymer body weave. It is fitted with an array of electromagnetic devices, including a full EM scrambler pulse, and antipersonnel discharge unit and a high-powered adhesion field built into the palms and soles of the boots. Grappler units are mounted on both arms and a full targeting and information HUD is within the helmet. In Zero Hour, these suits were used by the Zero Hour team of former H.I.V.E. pupils in the battle with Overlord and the Disciples’ forces.
Neural Feedback Suit – A suit that H.I.V.E. students have to wear in Colonel Francisco's Tactical Education lessons which allows them to feel pain without suffering any physical injury so that the students take the lessons seriously. The students nicknamed the suit “the Agoniser”.

External links
 Archived from the original 23-12-2014.

References

Fantasy novel series